Bear and the Gang is an advertising campaign for the Boston Bruins created by Arnold Worldwide and the Boston Bruins as part of the Bruins Digital Entertainment Network ('Bruins DEN').  It consists of several episodes that are approximately 60 seconds each.  Each episode is centered on the activities of the Bear character from the Bruins Hockey Rules commercials (not to be confused with the bear 'Blades,' who is the Bruins official mascot), and is in the form of a 1980s television sitcom.

Each Bear and the Gang episode guest-stars other popular Bruins figures besides the Bear, including players, coaches, Jack Edwards, Rene Rancourt, and 'Holly,' the captain of the Bruins Ice Girls.

History
On March 26, 2012 the Boston Bruins offered users of the Bruins official mobile app exclusive access to the first episode of Bear and the Gang. That same day, the Bruins posted the introduction to the 'series' on their website.

Cast
Cast members of the series include (in order of appearance in the opening credits):
 'The Bear'
 Brad Marchand
 Jack Edwards
 Rene Rancourt
 Tyler Seguin
 Shawn Thornton
 Andrew Ference
 Tuukka Rask
 Dennis Seidenberg
 Zdeno Chara
 Adam McQuaid
 David Krejci
 Patrice Bergeron
 Johnny Boychuk
 Cam Neely
 Claude Julien as "Coach"

Also Starring
 Bruins Ice Girl Holly

Episodes

References

External links
 Boston Bruins Official Web Site

Boston Bruins
Advertising campaigns